The 9th term Sejm and the 10th term Senate is the legislature of the Republic of Poland following the 2019 Polish parliamentary election held on 13 October 2019 which returned 460 deputies to the Sejm and 100 senators to the Senate.

The Parliament of Poland held its inaugural meeting on 12 November 2019.

Current standings

List of Parliamentary clubs and circles 

†Parliamentary group no longer represented in the Senate. Polish Coalition Senators are in a group independent of the Parliamentary club

9th term Sejm

List of political officers

List of deputies

1 – Legnica

2 – Wałbrzych

3 – Wrocław

4 – Bydgoszcz

5 – Toruń

6 – Lublin

7 – Chełm

8 – Zielona Góra

9 – Łódź

10 – Piotrków Trybunalski

11 – Sieradz

12 – Kraków I

13 – Kraków II

14 – Nowy Sącz

15 – Tarnów

16 – Płock

17 – Radom

18 – Siedlce

19 – Warsaw I

20 – Warsaw II

21 – Opole

22 – Krosno

23 – Rzeszów

24 – Białystok

25 – Gdańsk

26 – Słupsk

27 – Bielsko-Biała I

28 – Częstochowa

29 – Katowice I

30 – Bielsko-Biała II

31 – Katowice II

32 – Katowice III

33 – Kielce

34 – Elbląg

35 – Olsztyn

36 – Kalisz

37 – Konin

38 – Piła

39 – Poznań

40 – Koszalin

41 – Szczecin

Timeline

†Ryszard Galla (German Minority Electoral Committee)

10th term Senate

Timeline

References 

Politics of Poland
Government of Poland